Gilmore Township may refer to:

 Gilmore Township, Benzie County, Michigan
 Gilmore Township, Isabella County, Michigan
 Gilmore Township, McHenry County, North Dakota, in McHenry County, North Dakota
 Gilmore Township, Pennsylvania

Township name disambiguation pages